Synopticon may refer to:

 The concept of Surveillance of the few by the many, as identified by sociologist Thomas Mathiesen
 Synopticon, a 1996 interactive art installation by electronic music band Coldcut
 Synopticon, an 1880 book by W. G. Rushbrooke concerning Gospel Harmony
 A Syntopicon: An Index to The Great Ideas, compiled in 1952 by Mortimer Adler

See also
 Panopticism